Eagle Creek is a creek located mainly in Hood River County, Oregon, in the Columbia River Gorge, with its last roughly  and mouth in Multnomah County. The East Fork Eagle Creek is a major tributary that begins at Wahtum Lake and joins the main stem approximately 2/3 the way between the Thrush Pond and the Columbia River, separated by Indian Mountain.

Drainage basin
The Eagle Creek drainage basin is the largest of any creek in the western or central Gorge. The watershed is bounded by Tanner Ridge to the west, the Benson Plateau and Chinidere Mountain to the east, and Indian Mountain and Waucoma Ridge to the south. Another major tributary is Opal Creek, flowing from Tanner Butte to just above Tenas Falls.

Waterfalls

Eagle creek is notable for its numerous waterfalls. From the mouth upstream, the most notable are Metlako Falls, Punch Bowl Falls, Skoonichuk Falls, Grand Union Falls, Twister Falls, and Sevenmile Falls. Noteworthy waterfalls on Eagle Creek's many tributaries include Sorenson Falls, Loowit Falls, Four Mile Falls, Tenas Falls, Wy'east Falls, and Tunnel Falls.

Eagle Creek Bridge

The Eagle Creek Bridge is a contributing structure in the Columbia River Highway Historic District, which was listed on the National Register of Historic Places in 1983. It is self-evidently a closed spandrel arch bridge.

Recreation

Eagle Creek is an extremely popular recreation destination. The Eagle Creek Trail #440 runs for  along the creek from the Historic Columbia River Highway State Trail to a junction with the Pacific Crest Trail near Wahtum Lake, and its lower reaches comprise one of the most popular trails in the Gorge. Multiple other trails are also present on the surrounding ridges and mountains, providing connections to the rest of the Gorge's trail network.

History

The Eagle Creek watershed was severely impacted by the Eagle Creek Fire of 2017, which started near Punch Bowl Falls after a 15-year-old threw a firecracker into the canyon following a prolonged period without precipitation. Due to the increased risk of landslides, debris flows, and other hazards, recreation in the area was closed until January 2021. The trail briefly reopened, but was closed again after two weeks after landslides caused by heavy rain.

See also
List of bridges documented by the Historic American Engineering Record in Oregon
List of bridges on the National Register of Historic Places in Oregon

References

External links

Columbia River Gorge
Rivers of Oregon
Rivers of Hood River County, Oregon
Mount Hood National Forest
Tributaries of the Columbia River